Loughton may refer to:

Places in the United Kingdom
Loughton, Essex
Loughton tube station, the London Underground station in Loughton
Loughton Camp, an Iron Age hill fort in Epping Forest near Loughton
Loughton Urban District, a local government district from 1900 to 1933
Loughton, Milton Keynes
All Saints Church, Loughton, the oldest church in Loughton, Milton Keynes
Loughton, Shropshire

Other uses
Loughton (surname)